Gubinsky (masculine), Gubinskaya (feminine), or Gubinskoye (neuter) is the name of several rural localities in Russia:
Gubinskaya, Ivanovo Oblast, a village in Ivanovo Oblast
Gubinskaya, name of several other rural localities
Gubinskaya, in the 19th century, name of the village of Gubino, now in Orekhovo-Zuyevsky District of Moscow Oblast

See also
Nyvy-Hubynski, a village in Ukraine
Stargard Gubiński, a village in Poland